Cryptolechia proximihamatilis is a moth in the family Depressariidae. It was described by Wang in 2006. It is found in Sichuan, China.

The length of the forewings is about 12.5 mm. The forewings are greyish black with an inverted, triangular, orange-yellow spot at the distal one-fifth and an orange-yellow fascia extending from the middle of the costal margin to two-thirds the length of the dorsum, medially set with two small black dots along its inside and one elongate black spot along its outside. The hindwings are dark grey.

Etymology
The species name refers to the similarity with Cryptolechia hamatilis plus the Latin prefix proxim- (meaning near).

References

Moths described in 2006
Cryptolechia (moth)